Naomi Bristow (born 4 October 1997) is a country music artist from Beeton, Ontario, Canada. Her family was involved in the rodeo life which led her down the path of country, western and gospel music. Naomi has opened for Gene Watson, Johnny Reid, David Frizzell, Moe Bandy, Ronda Vincent, Charlie Daniels, Marty Stuart, Jim Ed Brown, George Canyon, Bobby Bare, Dean Brody and many others.

Achievements 
Naomi Bristow's Easter version of Hallelujah (lyrics by Kelley Mooney) went viral in the Spring of 2019 and reached 14 million views on Facebook. The song is a cover of Hallelujah originally written and recorded by Leonard Cohen in 1984.

In 2017, Bristow won the "Traditional Female Rising Star" award at the Josie Music Awards in Nashville, Tennessee. Some of her previous accolades include  the "Fans Choice Award" at the Havelock Country Jamboree, the "BC Cowboy Heritage award" and the Western Music Association two-time "Youth Yodeler of the Year award".  She has received Municipal, Provincial and Federal awards for outstanding achievement in music. In 2019, Bristow was invited to go on tour with the Scott Woods Band, where they performed 90 shows in 95 days. She was featured in the top 200 across Canada on Canada's Got Talent 2012 season. Naomi is a regular on RFD TV's Midwest Country Show and was featured on three seasons of the Shotgun Red Variety Show also on RFD TV. Naomi has recorded in Nashville featuring Grand Ole Opry stars, Jim Ed Brown and Richard Sterban. She has also recently recorded a Gospel CD with Vince Gill and a Christmas CD with Bill Anderson.

Discography 

Bristow was featured on three seasons of the Shotgun Red Variety Show aired on RFD-TV. She is also a regular guest on the Midwest Country Show which also aired on RFD-TV.

In the spring of 2008, Naomi recorded her first album titled "Cowboy Sweetheart", followed by "The Yodelin' Cowgirl", on November 1, 2008, and then "Ridin' High" which came out July 20, 2009. Ridin' High was awarded the "Best Traditional Yodel Album of the Year 2010" by the National Traditional Country Music Association in the United States. She recorded her first three albums at Ambassador Records in Oshawa, ON.

Her fourth CD "Lookin' Back" was recorded in Nashville, Tennessee, and Bristow was able to sing two duets with Jim Ed Brown, Grand Ole Opry Star. In the spring of 2011, Bristow recorded another album in Nashville. This was her 5th studio album and it was titled "Lovin' the Ride" featuring Jim Ed Brown and also Richard Sterban from the Oakridge Boys. In March 2012 Bristow's path took another direction. She recorded her most memorable CD titled "Blessed Trails". A lovely selection of gospel songs and featured the one and only Mr Vince Gill. This was an experience that will remain an incredible blessing in Naomi's journey.

Naomi released her 7th album with a collection of all her yodelling songs titled "Yee Haw Yodelin". In 2013, Naomi released her first DVD, “The Heart of a Cowgirl” which includes live performances and tapings from television shows she had appeared on.

A great mixture of traditional country music is featured on Naomi's CD, “Stayin’ On Track” which she released summer of 2014. Naomi decided to release another album in 2015 with another great collection of yodeling songs titled, “Just Yodelin”. Naomi is very excited to announce her new album, “Yodelin’ Christmas” with an assortment of Christmas songs and some yodeling. She is honoured to have Whisperin’ Bill Anderson sing his song, Po Folks Christmas as a duet with her.

References 

1997 births
Living people
Canadian women country singers
21st-century women musicians
Musicians from Ontario
People from Simcoe County
Yodelers